Alomancy, also called adromancy, ydromancie, idromancie, and halomancy, is an ancient form of divination. Similar to many other forms of divination, the diviner casts salt crystals into the air and interprets the patterns as it falls to the ground or travels through the air. The diviner can also interpret patterns formed from the residue of a salt solution as it evaporates in the bowl. The exact interpretations are unknown, but it probably follows a similar method to aleuromancy.

Salt itself is often intertwined with luck and some of this ancient tradition can be seen in the superstitions, such as perceived misfortune when the salt cellar is overturned and the custom of throwing salt over the left shoulder for good luck.

One form of alomancy consists of the casting of salt into a fire, which is considered a type of pyromancy.

References

Divination